Veeravanoor  is a village in Ramanathapuram District in the Indian state of Tamil Nadu.

Geography 

Veeravanoor covers 4 square miles (8.3 km2), and surrounded on the eastern side by forests, western side by Bogalur, southern side by Seyyalor village and on the northern side is Vairavanenthal village.

Climate 
The climate of Veeravanoor is tropical in nature with little variation in summer and winter temperatures. While April to June is the hottest summer period with the temperature rising up to the 40 °C mark, November to February is the coolest winter period with temperature hovering around 20 °C, making the climate quite pleasant. Surprisingly, Veeravanoor gets all its rains from the north-east monsoons between October and December.

Transport

Rail 
The nearest railway station is in Ramanathapuram (14 km) and Paramakudi (27 km) which has computerised reservation counters under Madurai division. Madurai division repeatedly has received the award for being the best-maintained station in the Southern Railway. The railway station code for Paramakudi is PMK and Ramamnathapuram is RMD. It is connected to Indian cities and towns including Chennai, Madurai, Rameshwaram, Trichy (by Sethu exp, Chennai exp and Passenger).

Road 
The nearest major bus terminals are Ramanathapuram, Paramakudi and Sathirakudi. Apart from government and private buses, three-wheeled, black and yellow auto-rickshaws, referred to as autos or share autos are available for travel within and around the village. There are also van available where commuters can pay fixed fare depends on destination and hire. Nearest major National Highways:
NH-49 : Madurai–Rameswaram
At the moment, the bus terminal of Veeravanoor is full of standing water and the Panchayat plan to clean up the area.

Air 

Education institutions in and around Veeravanoor 
 Arts and Science Govt. Arts College for Women, Ramanathapuram
 Govt. Arts College, Paramakudi
 Madurai Kamaraj University Evening College, Paramakudi
 Madurai Kamaraj University Evening College, Ramanathapuram
 Sethupathy Govt. Arts College, Ramanathapuram
 Syed Hammeda Arts and Science College, Kilakarai
 Thassim Beevi Abdul Kadar College for Women, Kilakarai

Engineering colleges 
 Syed Ammal Engineering College, Ramanathapuram
 Mohamed Sathak Engineering College, Kelakarai
 Government College Of Engineering, Ramanathapuram

Physiotherapy 
 Pioneer College of Physiotherapy, Ramanathapuram

Polytechnic 
 Mohammed Sathak Polytechnic, Kilakarai
 Sri Muthalamman Polytechnic College, Paramakudi

Teacher training institutes 
 Fatima Teacher Training Institute, Ramanathapuram
 Ganapathi Teacher Training Institute, Paramakudi
 Ganapathy College of Education, Paramakudi
 Puratchi Thalaivar Dr. M.G.R. College of Education, Ramanathapuram
 R.K. Samy College of Education, Ramanathapuram
 Sri Ragavendra Institute of Teacher Training, Paramakudi

Festivals 
Lot of festivals are celebrated by the Veeravanoor people. Some of the important festival are Diwali, Pongal, Ramadan, Eid, Christmas, Molakkottu festival and Kuthirai Eduppu.

References

External links 
 http://www.elections.tn.gov.in/pdfs/dt27/ac209/ac209176.pdf

Villages in Ramanathapuram district